The 1938 Saint Mary's Gaels football team was an American football team that represented Saint Mary's College of California during the 1938 college football season. In their 18th season under head coach Slip Madigan, the Gaels compiled a  record and outscored their opponents by a combined total of 106 to 41.  The season ended in January with a  victory over Texas Tech in the Cotton Bowl, led by sophomore back Mike Klotovich.

The Gaels were unranked in the AP Poll for the entire season; the final poll was released in early December. They did not win a game on Saturday all season; all of the regular season wins were played on Sunday and the two losses were road games.

Schedule

 Five games were played on Sunday (Gonzaga, Loyola, Portland, San Francisco, Santa Clara)

Season overview

at California
On September 24, the Gaels opened their 1938 season with a close 12–7 loss to California before a crowd of 50,000 in Berkeley. The preceding year's Cal team were undefeated and ended second-ranked in the final AP poll. The Gaels dominated the game for three quarters and led  at the start of the fourth quarter.

Gonzaga
On Sunday, October 2, the Gaels defeated Gonzaga  at Kezar Stadium in San Francisco.  St. Mary's touchdowns were scored by Mike Klotovich, Ed Heffernan, and Mike Pierrie.

at Loyola
On Sunday, October 9, the Gaels defeated the Loyola Lions  at the Los Angeles Memorial Coliseum. Fullback Herb Smith scored the only touchdown.

Portland
On Sunday, October 16, the Gaels defeated Portland  at Kezar Stadium in San Francisco.

vs. San Francisco
On Sunday, October 23, the Gaels defeated the San Francisco Dons  before 20,000 in the rain at Kezar.  San Francisco took a  lead into the fourth quarter, but the Gaels' scored two touchdowns, first on a pass from Klotovich to Aronson and later on a 53-yard run by Klotovich.

at Fordham
The Gaels' November 5 game against tenth-ranked Fordham drew 44,274 to the Polo Grounds in New York City. A Fordham field goal in the second quarter counted for the game's only points, as Fordham defeated St. Mary's

vs. Santa Clara
Eight days after losing a close game to Fordham, the Gaels upset previously undefeated Santa Clara   before 60,000 at Kezar in San Francisco. It ended Santa Clara's  winning streak, dating back to the 1936 season. Fullback Herb Smith scored the Gaels' touchdown.

Cotton Bowl

After the regular season, the Gaels were invited to play unbeaten and #11-ranked Texas Tech in the Cotton Bowl in Dallas on January 2, 1939.  The Gaels took a  lead into the fourth quarter and held on to defeat the Red Raiders  before 40,000. St. Mary's touchdowns were scored by Ed Heffernan and Michael Klotovich and by Whitey Smith on an interception return for a touchdown.

References

Saint Mary's
Saint Mary's Gaels football seasons
Cotton Bowl Classic champion seasons
Saint Mary's Gaels football